Jehan Ara is a Pakistani businesswoman who was the President of P@SHA for over 20 years. She resigned at the end of April 2021 to start Katalyst Labs a startup accelerator and women leadership program.  P. She also headed the Nest i/o a startup incubator supported by Google and Samsung. She is also a member of the Prime Minister's Task Force on IT and the Digital Economy and is on the Board of Punjab IT Board, the Central Depository Company and IDEAS.

Early life
Ara was born in Karachi, Pakistan and raised in Hong Kong where her father was working as a banker. She received her early education from Rosaryhill School.

After completing her graduation, she started her career as a journalist in a Hong Kong newspaper for a year before moving into advertising.

She worked in Dubai for several magazines and journals when her father moved to the United Arab Emirates where she worked for Gulf News in the advertising marketing department.

She moved back to Hong Kong and joined Headway Media Services as managing director. She moved to Pakistan in mid-1990s after the retirement of her father.

Career

After moving to Pakistan, Ara started her own multimedia company, Enabling Technologies in 1994. In 2007, Ara became president of P@SHA. In November 2018, she became a member of the Prime Minister's Task Force on IT and Telecom.

Recognition
In 2016, Ara was invited by US President Barack Obama to speak at Global Entrepreneurship Summit.

External links
 Blog
 Twitter

Reference 

Living people
People from Karachi
Year of birth missing (living people)
Pakistani women in business
Pakistani businesspeople